Khvosh (also Romanized as Khowsh and Khush; also known as Khosh) is a village in Sojas Rud Rural District, Sojas Rud District, Khodabandeh County, Zanjan Province, Iran. At the 2006 census, its population was 799, in 171 families.

References 

Populated places in Khodabandeh County